Cham-e Shir or Cham-i-Shir or Cham Shir may refer to:
 Cham-e Shir, Ilam
 Cham-i-Shir, Lorestan